Lucas Da Cunha (born 9 June 2001) is a French professional footballer who plays as an attacking midfielder for Serie B club Como.

Club career
Da Cunha is a youth product of Rennes. In the final of the 2018–19 Championnat National U19, he scored a hat-trick to help his team lift the trophy. On December 2017, Da Cunha signed his first professional contract with Rennes. He made his professional debut in a 3–2 Coupe de la Ligue loss to Amiens on 18 December 2019.

On 30 September 2020, Da Cunha signed a contract with Nice. He subsequently joined Lausanne-Sport on a season-long loan. On 17 January 2022, Da Cunha joined Clermont on a loan deal until the end of the season.

On 16 January 2023, Da Cunha was sold by Nice to Serie B club Como for a fee of €500,000. He signed a contract until the end of June 2026.

International career
Born in France, Da Cunha is of Portuguese descent. He is a youth international for France.

Honours 
Rennes U19

 Championnat National U19: 2018–19

Nice

 Coupe de France runner-up: 2021–22

References

External links
 
 
 
 

2001 births
Living people
French people of Portuguese descent
Sportspeople from Roanne
French footballers
Footballers from Auvergne-Rhône-Alpes
Association football midfielders
France youth international footballers
Ligue 1 players
Championnat National 2 players
Championnat National 3 players
Swiss Super League players

Stade Rennais F.C. players
OGC Nice players
FC Lausanne-Sport players
Clermont Foot players
Como 1907 players
French expatriate footballers
French expatriate sportspeople in Switzerland
Expatriate footballers in Switzerland
French expatriate sportspeople in Italy
Expatriate footballers in Italy